is a Japanese professional football (soccer) club, currently playing in the J2 League, the Japanese second tier of professional football. The team's hometown is located in Mito, Ibaraki Prefecture.

Name origin 
Its nickname "HollyHock" derives from the family crest of the Tokugawa clan who governed from Mito in the Edo period.

History 
The club was founded in 1990 as Prima Aseno FC by the factory workers of Prima Ham (a food company) in Tsuchiura. It changed its name to Prima Ham FC Tsuchiura and gained promotion to the Japan Football League after finishing as runner-up in the 1996 Regional League play-off. It merged with FC Mito (founded in 1994) and re-branded itself as Mito HollyHock before the start of the 1997 season when Prima Ham decided to discontinue its financial support to the club.

Mito's application to play in the inaugural 1999 season of J. League Division 2 was initially turned down due to financial unstability, and low home attendance at their stadium. However, after finishing 3rd in the Japan Football League in 1999, and having an increasing stadium attendance, the club was invited into the J. League in 2000.

Mito HollyHock also fields teams in e-sports and in Ice Hockey (Ibaraki Prefectural League).

League and cup record 

Key

Current squad 
As of 17 March 2023.

Out on loan

Club officials 
For the 2023 season.

Managerial history

Kit evolution

Images from the former home stadium

References

External links
 Official Site 
 English News Site
 Mito HollyHock 2014 Squad

 
J.League clubs
Football clubs in Japan
Association football clubs established in 1994
Mito, Ibaraki
Sports teams in Ibaraki Prefecture
1994 establishments in Japan
Japan Football League (1992–1998) clubs
Japan Football League clubs